Medal of Honor is an anthology documentary series that is based on real life combat events and personal sacrifice that ultimately lead to being awarded the Medal of Honor.  The series highlights Medal of Honor awards that are given both posthumously in addition to awards given to recipients who are still alive today. Each episode recreates one person's experience pertaining to the story behind their Medal of Honor award.

Plot 
The anthology series combines archival footage, dramatic recreations and interviews with family members, historians, news reporters and fellow veterans to tell each person's unique experience that led to the bestowment of the Medal of Honor, America's highest and most prestigious military decoration.

Season 1 
Medal of Honor recipients highlighted.

 Episode 1: Sylvester Antolak (World War II), portrayed by Joseph Cross
 Episode 2: Clinton Romesha (War in Afghanistan), portrayed by Paul Wesley
 Episode 3: Edward A. Carter Jr. (World War II), portrayed by Aldis Hodge
 Episode 4: Hiroshi H. Miyamura (Korean War), portrayed by Derek Mio
 Episode 5: Vito R. Bertoldo (World War II), portrayed by Ben Schwartz
 Episode 6: Joseph Vittori (Korean War), portrayed by Steven R. McQueen
 Episode 7: Richard Etchberger (Vietnam War), portrayed by Oliver Hudson
 Episode 8: Ty Carter (War in Afghanistan), portrayed by Jonny Weston

Development and production 
The series is produced by Allentown Productions and Compari Entertainment, and is distributed by Netflix.

Reception 
 
Eddie Strait at DailyDot.com rated the series 3.5/5, stating, "It's an ode to service, but more than that, it's a testament to empathy. The show finds a way to honor its subjects without becoming self-congratulatory."

References

External links 

 
 

2018 American television series debuts
2010s American anthology television series
English-language Netflix original programming
Documentaries about historical events
2010s American documentary television series
Documentary television series about World War II
Iraq War in television
Korean War television series
Netflix original documentary television series
War television series
World War II television documentaries
World War II television drama series
World War II television series